Dugald may refer to:

Places 
 Dugald, Manitoba, a town in the province of Manitoba, Canada

People 
 Dugald Campbell Scottish doctor
 Dugald Christie (1941–2006), Canadian lawyer and activist
 Dugald Drummond (1840–1912), Scottish engineer
 Dugald Malcolm (born 1917), British diplomat
 Dugald McGregor, Australian rugby league footballer
 Dugald Clark, Scottish Engineer
 Dugald Semple (1884–1964), Scottish writer and simple living advocate
 Dugald Stewart (1753–1828), Scottish philosopher
 Dugald Sutherland MacColl (1859–1948), Scottish watercolour painter and art critic
 Clinton Dugald MacDougall, American Representative from New York
 Dubgall mac Somairle, also known as Dugald mac Somerled, and Dugald MacSorley

See also 
 Dugald train disaster, a Canadian National Railway train wreck between two passenger trains
 Dugal